Big Foot Prairie is an unincorporated community and census-designated place in Walworth County, Wisconsin, United States. It was named a CDP for the 2020 census, at which time it had a population of 22. The community of Big Foot Prairie extends south into McHenry County, Illinois, where there is a CDP of the same name in Chemung Township.

History
The community is named for Big Foot, a Potawatomi leader who resided on nearby Kishwauketoe (today known as Geneva Lake) until his band was forcibly removed by the United States in 1836. It once had a post office, which opened on May 15, 1848.

Demographics

Notable people
Phipps W. Lake, Free Will Baptist minister and member of the Wisconsin State Assembly
Lewis N. Wood, physician and member of the Wisconsin State Assembly

References

Census-designated places in Wisconsin
Census-designated places in Walworth County, Wisconsin
Populated places established in 1848